The following lists events that happened during 1956 in the Union of Soviet Socialist Republics.

Incumbents
 First Secretary of the Communist Party of the Soviet Union – Nikita Khrushchev
 Chairman of the Presidium of the Supreme Soviet of the Soviet Union – Kliment Voroshilov
 Chairman of the Council of Ministers of the Soviet Union – Nikolai Bulganin

Events

February
 9 February – The report of the Pospelov Commission is presented to the presidium.
 14–25 February – 20th Congress of the Communist Party of the Soviet Union
 25 February – Nikita Khrushchev makes the speech On the Cult of Personality and Its Consequences at the 20th Congress of the CPSU.

March
 March – 1956 Georgian demonstrations

October
 19 October – Soviet–Japanese Joint Declaration of 1956

November
 4 November – United Nations Security Council Resolution 120 is passed.
 7 November – The 2nd Soviet Antarctic Expedition leaves Kaliningrad
 18 November – "We will bury you" is spoken by Nikita Khrushchev.
 21 November – Soviet submarine M-200 is rammed and sunk by a Soviet destroyer, killing the submarine's crew.

Births
 13 January - Vladimir Merovshchikov, Russian professional football coach and former player
 1 March - Dalia Grybauskaite, president of Lithuania
 19 March – Yegor Gaidar, economist (d. 2009)
 6 May – Vladimir Lisin, oligarch
 10 May – Vladislav Nikolayevich Listyev, journalist
 7 November – Mikhail Alperin, jazz pianist, member of the Moscow Art Trio, professor at the Norwegian Academy of Music (d. 2018).

Deaths
 3 January – Alexander Gretchaninov, composer

See also
 1956 in fine arts of the Soviet Union
 List of Soviet films of 1956

References

 
1950s in the Soviet Union
Years in the Soviet Union
Soviet Union
Soviet Union
Soviet Union